Hawks is a 1988 British comedy film about two terminally ill patients, an English lawyer named Bancroft (Timothy Dalton) and a young Gridiron football player (Anthony Edwards), who decide to sneak out of their hospital rooms and live life to its fullest for whatever time they have left. Their goal is to reach a famous brothel in Amsterdam. Along the way, they encounter various characters including a pair of misfit British women played by Camille Coduri and Janet McTeer.

It was filmed on location in London's Charing Cross Hospital and in the Netherlands.

The film was directed by Robert Ellis Miller and based on a short story written by Barry Gibb of the Bee Gees and David English, and the screenplay was written by Roy Clarke. The musical score was composed by Gibb.

The film is rated R16 in New Zealand for nudity, sexual references and offensive language.

Cast
Timothy Dalton – Bancroft 
Anthony Edwards – Deckermensky 
Janet McTeer – Hazel 
Camille Coduri – Maureen 
Jill Bennett – Vivian Bancroft 
Robert Lang – Walter Bancroft 
Bruce Boa – Byron Deckermensky 
Pat Starr – Millie Deckermensky 
Sheila Hancock – Regina 
Geoffrey Palmer – SAAB Salesman 
Caroline Langrishe – Carol 
Benjamin Whitrow – Mr. Granger 
Connie Booth – Nurse Jarvis 
Julie T. Wallace – Ward Sister

See also
Knockin' on Heaven's Door, a 1997 film with a similar plot
The Bucket List, a 2007 film with a similar plot

References

External links
 
 

1988 films
1980s buddy comedy films
1980s road comedy-drama films
1980s sex comedy films
British buddy films
British road comedy-drama films
British sex comedy films
1980s English-language films
Films about cancer in the United Kingdom
Films directed by Robert Ellis Miller
Films scored by John Cameron
Films set in Amsterdam
Films set in London
Films shot at Pinewood Studios
1988 comedy films
1988 drama films
1980s British films